Oleg Kosterin (born 1963, Omsk, Олег Энгельсович Костерин) is a Russian genetic and entomologist, specializing at Odonata. He discovered and described a number of species (and also two genera - Euthygomphus and Mattigomphus) and several have been named after him by other scientists.

Species named after him 
 Drepanosticta kosterini Dow, 2017 (Odonata, Platystictidae)
 Asiagomphus kosterini Kompier, 2018 (Odonata, Gomphidae)
 Dolychopus kosterini Grichanov, 2017 (Diptera, Dolichopodidae)
 Alucita kosterini Ustjuzhanin, 1999
 Stenoptilia kosterini Ustjuchanin, 2001
 Cernyia kosterini Dubatolov et Buczek, 2013
 Lyclene kosterini Dubatolov et Buczek, 2013
 Coenosia kosterini Vikhrev, 2009 (Diptera, Muscidae).
 Thricops kosterini Vikhrev, 2013 (Diptera, Muscidae).
 Cordilura kosterini Ozerov et Krivosheina (Diptera, Scatophagidae).

Sources 
 About him
 His site
Kosterin O. E. 2015. Fundamentals of Genetics. Part 1. Basic concepts, the definition of gender and related issues, genetic recombination. Novosibirsk: RIC NGU, 410 p. (about the author - on the last page of the cover)
Beolens B. 2018. Eponym Dictionary of Odonata. Whittles Publishing. 480 p. (brief biography of Kosterina O. E.)

1963 births
Living people
Russian entomologists